CFWP-FM (Hawk Radio) was a First Nations community radio station broadcasting at 98.3 FM, in the Wahta Mohawk Territory, Ontario, Canada. The station began broadcasting in 2004 and was owned by the Wahta Mohawk First Nation through the Wahta Communications Society, under the licensee of Matthew Commandant, "on behalf of a non-profit organization to be incorporated".

The station had a signal covering much of the Wahta Reserve, but was somewhat weak in nearby Bala. Westwards towards Georgian Bay, it could be heard as far as Midland.

The station was on air from around November 17, 2002 until August 15, 2008. It has since been shut down by the current band council for political reasons. It is uncertain if the station will return to the air, as no renewal application had been filed with the CRTC, and the owner has not filed an application for a new license.

References

External links
 Hawk Radio 98.3 FM
 

Fwp
Fwp
Fwp
Radio stations established in 2002
Radio stations disestablished in 2008
2002 establishments in Ontario
2008 disestablishments in Ontario
FWP-FM